In applied mathematics, the Joukowsky transform, named after Nikolai Zhukovsky (who published it in 1910), is a conformal map historically used to understand some principles of airfoil design.

The transform is

 

This transform is also called the Joukowsky transformation, the Joukowski transform, the Zhukovsky transform and other variations.

In aerodynamics, the transform is used to solve for the two-dimensional potential flow around a class of airfoils known as Joukowsky airfoils.  A Joukowsky airfoil is generated in the complex plane (-plane) by applying the Joukowsky transform to a circle in the -plane.  The coordinates of the centre of the circle are variables, and varying them modifies the shape of the resulting airfoil.  The circle encloses the point  (where the derivative is zero) and intersects the point  This can be achieved for any allowable centre position  by varying the radius of the circle.

Joukowsky airfoils have a cusp at their trailing edge. A closely related conformal mapping, the Kármán–Trefftz transform, generates the broader class of Kármán–Trefftz airfoils by controlling the trailing edge angle. When a trailing edge angle of zero is specified, the Kármán–Trefftz transform reduces to the Joukowsky transform.

General Joukowsky transform

So the real and imaginary components are:

Sample Joukowsky airfoil
The transformation of all complex numbers on the unit circle is a special case.

which gives

So the real component becomes  and the imaginary component becomes .

Thus the complex unit circle maps to a flat plate on the real-number line from −2 to +2.

Transformations from other circles make a wide range of airfoil shapes.

Velocity field and circulation for the Joukowsky airfoil

The solution to potential flow around a circular cylinder is analytic and well known.  It is the superposition of uniform flow, a doublet, and a vortex.

The complex conjugate velocity  around the circle in the -plane is

where
  is the complex coordinate of the centre of the circle,
  is the freestream velocity of the fluid,
 is the angle of attack of the airfoil with respect to the freestream flow,
  is the radius of the circle, calculated using ,
  is the circulation, found using the Kutta condition, which reduces in this case to 

The complex velocity  around the airfoil in the -plane is, according to the rules of conformal mapping and using the Joukowsky transformation,

From this velocity, other properties of interest of the flow, such as the coefficient of pressure and lift per unit of span can be calculated.

A Joukowsky airfoil has a cusp at the trailing edge.

The transformation is named after Russian scientist Nikolai Zhukovsky.  His name has historically been romanized in a number of ways, thus the variation in spelling of the transform.

Kármán–Trefftz transform  

The Kármán–Trefftz transform is a conformal map closely related to the Joukowsky transform.  While a Joukowsky airfoil has a cusped trailing edge, a Kármán–Trefftz airfoil—which is the result of the transform of a circle in the -plane to the physical -plane, analogue to the definition of the Joukowsky airfoil—has a non-zero angle at the trailing edge, between the upper and lower airfoil surface.  The Kármán–Trefftz transform therefore requires an additional parameter: the trailing-edge angle  This transform is

 

The derivative , required to compute the velocity field, is

Background

First, add and subtract 2 from the Joukowsky transform, as given above:

 

Dividing the left and right hand sides gives

 

The right hand side contains (as a factor) the simple second-power law from potential flow theory, applied at the trailing edge near  From conformal mapping theory, this quadratic map is known to change a half plane in the -space into potential flow around a semi-infinite straight line. Further, values of the power less than 2 will result in flow around a finite angle. So, by changing the power in the Joukowsky transform to a value slightly less than 2, the result is a finite angle instead of a cusp.

 

which is the Kármán–Trefftz transform. Solving for  gives it in the form of equation .

Symmetrical Joukowsky airfoils
In 1943 Hsue-shen Tsien published a transform of a circle of radius  into a symmetrical airfoil that depends on parameter  and angle of inclination :

 

The parameter  yields a flat plate when zero, and a circle when infinite; thus it corresponds to the thickness of the airfoil. Furthermore the radius of the cylinder .

Notes

References

External links 
 Joukowski Transform NASA Applet
 Joukowsky Transform Interactive WebApp

Conformal mappings
Aerodynamics
Aircraft wing design